Chalcorana raniceps, also known as the copper-cheeked frog, white-lipped frog, or Peters' Malaysian frog, is a species of "true frog" in the family Ranidae. It is endemic to Borneo, including Brunei Darussalam, Kalimantan (Indonesia), and Sarawak (Malaysia), although it is likely to occur more widely. Previously mixed with Chalcorana chalconota (treated as a junior synonym or a subspecies) and believed to have much wider distribution, its range was delimited to Borneo in the revision of "Rana chalconota" complex by Robert Inger and colleagues in 2009.

Description
Chalcorana raniceps are relatively small frogs: adult males measure  and females  in snout–vent length. Colouration is mostly green, sometimes with brown back. The snout is long and pointed. Finger and toe tips have adhesive disks. The thighs may be reddish undersides. It resembles Chalcorana megalonesa but is much smaller. Tadpoles are conspicuous with dark markings and red gills on light brown to yellow background; presumably, they are poisonous.

Habitat
Chalcorana raniceps inhabits a broad range of lowland primary and secondary rainforest habitats. It breeds in ponds, intermittent streams, and quiet side pools of streams. Males call in small groups from twigs and vegetation 0.5–1.5 m above the ground.

References

raniceps
Endemic fauna of Borneo
Amphibians of Brunei
Amphibians of Indonesia
Amphibians of Malaysia
Amphibians described in 1871
Taxa named by Wilhelm Peters
Amphibians of Borneo